The Mercedes-Benz EQS (V297) is a battery electric full-size luxury liftback produced by German automobile manufacturer Mercedes-Benz Group. It was released in September 2021 in Germany and the fourth quarter of the year in the United States. It is part of the Mercedes-Benz EQ family.

Presentation 

The EQS was presented at the International Motor Show Germany in 2019 as the Mercedes-Benz Vision EQS and foreshadows the future Mercedes-Benz series luxury electric sedan announced for 2021. The production model debuted on 15 April 2021.

Technical details 

The EQS is the first EQ model that is based on the technical platform specific to the electric models, called the MEA. The car's drag coefficient is as low as 0.20, making it the most aerodynamic car in production at the time of its introduction.

The car is powered by a water-cooled permanent magnet synchronous motor from Valeo Siemens in the EQS 450+ model, and by two of these motors in the EQS 580 4MATIC model. The torque is sent from the motor(s) to the wheels through a single-speed reduction gearbox. With the 107.8 kW·h secondary cell, the car has a range of more than 638 km. The average recharging power is 163 kW with a peak of >200 kW, allowing the car to reach a 79 % state of charge in about half an hour.

The Mercedes-AMG EQS 53 4Matic+ was presented at the Munich Motor Show in September 2021 and is the first all-electric AMG car. It has two electric motors producing  of power and delivering  of torque. Its handling characteristics as well as its cooling system have been upgraded to match the motors' higher power output.

Equipment 
The car comes with rear-wheel steering, over-the-air updates, wireless phone charging, 360-degree camera system, keyless entry and can optionally be equipped with seats with massage, augmented reality head-up display, automatically opening and closing doors, integrated toll payment system, gesture controls, HEPA air filter, heat, noise and infrared rays insulated glass and heated windshield.

MBUX Hyperscreen

The high-end versions of Mercedes-Benz EQS feature two separate OLED screens and an LCD instrument cluster that covers nearly the full extension of the dashboard. The whole infotainment system is powered by eight CPU cores and 24 gigabytes of RAM. The multi-purpose digital dashboard has been well received by consumers.

Safety and automated features
The car has several safety and automated features: adaptive cruise control, lane centering, automatic lane changing, automated emergency braking, avoidance assist (for pedestrians and bicycles), blind spot monitoring including rear seat exit warning, cross-traffic alert, traffic-sign recognition, automatic parking assist, adaptive headlights.

The system is a World first and works by using LiDAR, cameras, microphones and various sensors. It is planned to also become available to other countries. The car is the first that can be fit a level 4 automated valet parking system named Intelligent Park Pilot.

Models 
The specifications include:

Reviews and reception 
In December 2022, Bloomberg listed the EQS as a terrific alternative option to the Model S from Tesla for auto owners angered by Elon Musk.

References

External links 

 Concept Mercedes-Maybach EQS Daimler AG. 5 September 2021
 Premiere of the Concept Mercedes-Maybach EQS 5 September 2021
 EQS of Mercedes-EQ

EQS
Cars introduced in 2021
Full-size vehicles
Luxury vehicles
Hatchbacks
Production electric cars
Flagship vehicles
Mercedes-EQ